Neltume River is a river in the commune of Panguipulli, southern Chile. It drains Neltume Lake and flows southward where it joins Fuy River and creates together Llanquihue River.

See also
List of rivers of Chile

References

Rivers of Chile
Rivers of Los Ríos Region